The Sultan Bazar Clock Tower is a clock tower located in Hyderabad, India.

History 
The clock tower was built along with the Chudderghat Anglo-Vernacular School, in 1865. 

Presently, the clock tower as well as the school building lies in a dilapidated condition.

See also 

 List of clock towers

Clock towers in India
Hyderabad, India

References